Live in Japan 2004 is a live album by the American rock band Incubus, released in 2004. The album's  proceeds go to the band's charitable arm, the Make Yourself Foundation. It was recorded on March 3, 2004, at Nippon Budokan in Tokyo, Japan.

People who pre-ordered Live in Japan 2004 also received a limited Japanese Incubus promotional poster.

Track listing
Disc one
 Megalomaniac
 A Crow Left of the Murder
 Warning
 Consequence
 Idiot Box
 Nowhere Fast
 Just a Phase
 Priceless
 Wish You Were Here
 Pantomime
 Here In My Room
Disc two
 Pistola
 Circles
 Vitamin
 Clean
 Talk Shows on Mute
 A Certain Shade of Green
 Sick Sad Little World
 Pardon Me

Credits

Incubus
Brandon Boyd – vocals
Mike Einziger – guitar
Ben Kenney – bass
Chris Kilmore – turntables, keyboards, mellotron, marxophone
José Pasillas – drums, percussion

Incubus (band) albums
2004 live albums